The Association for Iron and Steel Technology (AIST) is a non-profit professional organization focused on promoting the international iron and steel industry through networking and education. The AIST has over 17,500 members in over 70 countries, though the majority of its members are from North America, reflecting its historical link to the American Steel industry.   The AIST was formed from a merger from two older organizations, the Association of Iron and Steel Engineers and the Iron and Steel Society in 2004. AIST is a member organization of the American Institute of Mining, Metallurgical, and Petroleum Engineers (AIME). The head office of the organization is in Warrendale, Pennsylvania.  From these offices is published the monthly Iron and Steel Technology magazine. The Association also runs an international conference each year called AISTech. AIST also offers training courses and local events organized by its various member chapters and technical committees.

Technology Divisions 

The AIST has a number of active Divisions reflecting the diversity of technological interests in the steel industry, these are:
Safety and Environment
Cokemaking and Ironmaking
Steelmaking
Refining and Casting
Rolling and Processing
Metallurgy
Energy and Control
Plant Services and Reliability
Materials Movement and Transportation

These divisions are served by a number of committees that organize sessions at the AISTech conference and oversee training and education activities relating to these areas of knowledge.

References

Trade associations based in the United States
Engineering societies based in the United States